The 1974–75 Idaho Vandals men's basketball team represented the University of Idaho during the 1974–75 NCAA Division I men's basketball season. Members of the Big Sky Conference, the Vandals were led by first-year head coach Jim Jarvis and played their home games on campus at the Memorial Gymnasium in Moscow, Idaho. They were 10–16 overall and 4–10 in conference play.

No Vandals were named to the all-conference team; senior guard Henry Harris was on the second team and junior guard Steve Weist was honorable mention.

Hired in March 1974, Jarvis was previously the head coach for three years at Spokane Falls Community College, and led the Vandal program for four seasons. He played at Oregon State under head coach Slats Gill and for several seasons as a professional.

References

External links
Sports Reference – Idaho Vandals: 1974–75 basketball season
Gem of the Mountains: 1975 University of Idaho yearbook – 1974–75 basketball season
Idaho Argonaut – student newspaper – 1975 editions

Idaho Vandals men's basketball seasons
Idaho
Idaho
Idaho